This is a list of equestrian statues in Germany.

Karlsruhe 
 Memorial to Baden dragoon in World War I (Leibdragonerdenkmal) by close to the Mühlburger Tor.
Emperor Wilhelm I by Adolf Heer at the Kaiserplatz, 1897

Kiel 
Emperor Wilhelm I by Adolf Brütt in the Schlosspark, 1896.

Koblenz 
German Corner - the monument of Emperor Wilhelm I by Emil Hundrieser. It is the tallest of the Kaiser Wilhelm equestrian monuments, the sculpture itself is 14 meters high.

Krefeld 
Memorial to fallen Krefelder Tanzhusaren at the Grafschaftsplatz, 1929.

Lübeck 
Emperor Wilhelm I by Louis Tuaillon between Central station und Lindenplatz.

Magdeburg 
Magdeburg Horseman (Magdeburger Reiter, probably showing Emperor Otto I the Great), ca. 1240. It is the first equestrian sculpture north of the Alps.
Emperor Wilhelm I at the Universitätsplatz, destroyed.

Merseburg 
King Friedrich Wilhelm III by Louis Tuaillon.

Munich 
Elector Maximilian I by Bertel Thorvaldsen at the Wittelsbacherplatz.
King Ludwig I by Max von Widnmann at the Odeonsplatz, 1862.

Nuremberg 
Emperor Wilhelm I by Wilhelm von Rümann at the Egidienplatz, 1905.

Osnabrück 
Emperor Wilhelm I by Adolf Heer at the Goetheplatz, 1899.

Saarbrücken 
Emperor Wilhelm I close to the Alte Brücke (Old Bridge), destroyed after 1945.
Den Gefallenen Soldaten monument.

Sankt Andreasberg 
Emperor Wilhelm I by Karl Harzig, 1906.

Schwerin 
Grand Duke Friedrich Franz II by Ludwig Brunow close to Schlossgarten, 1893.
 The Obotrite Prince Niklot at the Schwerin Castle (sculptor, Christian Genschow)

Solingen 
Archbishop Engelbert II by Paul Wynand in Schloss Burg, 1925.

Stuttgart 
Emperor Wilhelm I by Wilhelm von Rümann at the Karlsplatz, 1898.
King Wilhelm I by Ludwig von Hofer in the Konrad-Adenauer-Straße.
Duke Eberhard I by Ludwig von Hofer in Altes Schloss, 1859.

Waldheim 
Emperor Wilhelm I by Gustav Eberlein.

Weimar 
Grand Duke Karl August by Adolf von Donndorf, 1867-1875.

Weißenfels 
Emperor Wilhelm I by Ernst Wenck.

Wriezen 
Emperor Wilhelm I close to Rathaus, destroyed after 1945.

Überlingen 
Martin Walser (Reiter über den Bodensee) by Peter Lenk.

Wuppertal 
Emperor Wilhelm I by Gustav Eberlein in Elberfeld, 1893.
Emperor Wilhelm II on elevation of the Intercity-Hotels.

Germany
Lists of buildings and structures in Germany